Shelby is both a surname and a unisex given name. Notable people with the name include:

People with the name

Epithet
 Uncle Shelby, the pen name used by Shel Silverstein (1930–1999) when writing children's books

Given name 
Shelby Lee Adams (born 1950), American photographer
Shelby Babcock (born 1992), American softball player
Shelby Bach (born 1986), American children's writer
Shelby Blackstock (born 1990), American racing driver
Shelby Brewer (1937–2015), American nuclear engineer
Shelby Bryan (born 1946), American technology executive
Shelby Chong (born 1948), American comedian, actress, and producer
Shelby Ivey Christie, American fashion and costume historian
Shelby Coffey III (born 1946/1947), American journalist and business executive
Shelby Coleman (born 1992), American fashion model
Shelby Moore Cullom (1829–1914), member of the U.S. House of Representatives and Senate, and 17th Governor of Illinois
Shelby Cullom Davis (1909–1994), American investment banker, philanthropist and United States Ambassador to Switzerland
Shelby Davis (born 1937), American money manager; son of Shelby Cullom Davis
Shelby Dressel (born 1990), American singer-songwriter
Shelby Earl (born 1976), American singer-songwriter
Shelby Fero (born 1993), American comedian and screenwriter
Shelby Flint (born 1939), American singer-songwriter
Shelby Foote (1916–2005), American historian and novelist
Shelby Gaines, American musician and visual artist
Shelby Grant (1936–2011), American actress born Brenda Thompson
Shelby Harris (born 1991), American football player
Shelby Millard Harrison (1881–1970), American social scientist
Shelby Hearon (1931–2016), American writer
Shelby Highsmith (1929–2015), American federal judge
Shelby Hogan (born 1998), American soccer goalkeeper
Shelby Holliday, American television journalist
Shelby Houlihan (born 1993), American runner
Shelby Howard (born 1985), American racing driver
Shelby Hughes (1981–2014), American artist and designer
Shelby D. Hunt (born 1939), American business theorist
Shelby J. (born 1972), American singer-songwriter
Shelby Jacobs (1935–2022), American engineer
Shelby James (born 1973), American sport cyclist
Shelby Jensen (born 2001), American wheelchair fencer
Shelby Jordan (born 1952), American football player
Shelby Kisiel (born 1994), American rhythmic gymnast
Shelby Kutty, Indian-born American cardiologist
Shelby A. Laxson (1913–1982), American politician
Shelby F. Lewis, American political scientist and scholar
Shelby Lindley (born 1986), American voice actress
Shelby Linville (1929–2008), American basketball player
Shelby Lynne (born 1968), American singer-songwriter
Shelby Lyons (born 1981), American retired figure skater
Shelby Metcalf (1930–2007), American basketball coach
Shelby Miller (born 1990), American baseball pitcher 
Shelby Pierson, American intelligence official
Shelby Rabara (born 1983), American actress and dancer
Shelby Ringdahl (born 1992), American beauty pageant winner
Shelby Robertson, American comics artist
Shelby Rogers (born 1992), American tennis player
Shelby Singleton (1931–2009), American record producer and record label owner
Shelby Starner (1984–2003), American singer-songwriter and musician
Shelby Steele (born 1946), American author, columnist, documentary film maker and academic
Shelby G. Tilford (1937–2022), American scientist
Shelby Tracy Tom (1963–2003), Canadian female murder victim
Shelby Tucker (born 1935), American lawyer and journalist
Shelby Walker (1937–2006), American boxer
Shelby Westbrook (1922–2016), American aviator and Tuskegee Airman
Shelby Whitfield (1935–2013), American sportscaster
Shelby Wilson (born 1937), American wrestler and 1960 Olympic gold medalist
Shelby Young (born 1992), American actress

Surname 

Carroll Shelby (1923–2012), automobile racer, designer and entrepreneur
Charlotte Shelby (1877–1957), Broadway actress
Don Shelby (born 1947), news anchor who popularized the Pratt-Shelby knot, a method for tying a necktie
Isaac Shelby (1750–1826), first and fifth Governor of Kentucky
Jane Shelby Richardson (born 1941), American biophysicist who developed protein ribbon diagrams
Joseph O. Shelby (1830–1897), Confederate States Army general during the American Civil War
John Shelby (born 1958), former Major League Baseball player
Margaret Shelby (1900–1939), American stage and motion picture actress
Lon R. Shelby (born 1935), American academic
Richard Shelby (born 1934), United States Senator from Alabama, formerly a United States Representative and an Alabama state senator
Thomas Shelby (disambiguation)

Fictional entities 
Shelby Marcus, from Best Friends Whenever
Shelby (dog), Clark Kent's dog in the TV series Smallville
Shelby, the family name of the principal gangsters featured in the BBC TV series Peaky Blinders and the name of their family business
Shelby Corcoran, in the TV series Glee
Shelby Eatenton-Latcherie, in the play Steel Magnolias and its film adaptation
Shelby Merrick, in the TV series Higher Ground
Shelby Watkins, in the TV series Power Rangers Dino Charge
Shelby Wyatt, in the TV series Quantico
Shelby Woo, in the TV series The Mystery Files of Shelby Woo
Shelby, from The Wolves of Mercy Falls
Tommy Shelby, roadman in Peaky Blinders (TV series)